Mogan may refer to:

Mogán, Las Palmas, municipality in Las Palmas, Spain
Mount Mogan, mountain in Deqing County, Zhejiang Province, China
Lake Mogan, a lake in Ankara Province, Turkey